Trochetia boutoniana also known by its native Creole name boucle d'oreille is a shrub from the genus Trochetia endemic to Mauritius. Traditionally included in the family Sterculiaceae, it is included in the expanded Malvaceae in the APG and most subsequent systematics.

Description

It can reach a height up to 3 m.  The leaves are oval shaped and due to its xerophyte adaptations it is leathery on the underparts. Also, stipules are present. The petals are between 5 and 6 cm and they grow asymmetrically. They are bell-shaped and their coloring is dark red with a white background. The capsule is globular and contains up to 10 black seeds. The flowering time of the plant is from June to October.

This plant is relatively rare because of its weak regeneration and due to introduced monkeys which feed on the flower buds. The only occurrences are on the slopes of Le Morne Brabant, Mauritius. Thanks to the efforts of botanist Joseph Gueho seeds were successfully germinated and grown in cultivation for the first time in 1973.

Trochetia boutoniana is the national flower of Mauritius since 1992 and it is often illustrated on stamps of Mauritius. It was named after French botanist Louis Bouton.

References
 Ameenah Gurib-Fakim (2003): An Illustrated Guide to the Flora of Mauritius and the Indian Ocean Islands

External links
Conservation ecology and evolution of reproductive systems in the island endemic plants of the genus Trochetia (engl.)

boutoniana
Endemic flora of Mauritius